Nool may refer to:
 NOOL - An online library offering multi-lingual books 
 Nool or Hydron, an enemy character from Red Earth
 Jungle of Nool, a fictional place in Horton Hears A Who 
 Nool - A mobile app for short-form, asynchronous video conversations

People with the surname
 Erki Nool, decathlon gold medalist

See also
 Arul Nool, a holy script of Ayyavazhi